"El licenciado Vidriera" ("The Lawyer of Glass") is a short story written by Miguel de Cervantes and included in his Novelas ejemplares, first published in 1613.

Plot summary 

Tomás Rodaja, a young boy, is found by strangers, apparently abandoned. He impresses them with his wit and intelligence enough for them to take him on as a sort of adoptive son. Tomás is sent to school, where he becomes famous for his learning; he grows up, travels all over Europe, and eventually settles in Salamanca, where he completes a degree in law.

In love with Tomás, a young woman procures an intended love potion, with which she laces a quince that Tomás eats. The potion does not work, instead putting Tomás in a grave state for months (the woman flees and is never heard from again).

When he re-emerges from convalescence Tomás is physically restored but delusional – chiefly, Tomás is convinced that his whole body is composed entirely of glass. His unshakable belief, combined with Tomás' clever, memorable aphorisms in conversation with everyone he meets, make Tomás famous throughout Spain, where he becomes known as 'Vidriera' – from the Spanish vidrio, which means 'glass'. Eventually, Tomás is invited to court, transported in a carriage packed with hay.

With time, Tomás recovers his sanity, only to discover to his horror throngs of people who never leave him alone, wanting to see the famous 'Vidriera'. Repulsed by fame and unable to continue as a lawyer, Tomás joins the army as an infantryman, eventually dying in an obscure battle.

Trivia 

The term licenciado vidriera has entered the Spanish language as meaning one excessively timid or delicate.

References

External links

1613 short stories
Short stories by Miguel de Cervantes
Comic short stories